Vitaljina is a village in Croatia. Connected by the D516 highway, it is the southernmost settlement in mainland Croatia. Administratively Vitaljina belongs to the municipality of Konavle, Dubrovnik-Neretva County

References

Populated places in Dubrovnik-Neretva County
Konavle